Conquer by the Clock was a short dramatic propaganda film produced by the RKO Pathé in 1942 to encourage wartime industrial production. It was nominated for an Academy Award for Best Documentary Feature in 1943.

See also 
 List of Allied propaganda films of World War II
United States home front during World War II

References

External links 
 
 

1942 films
1940s war films
American World War II propaganda shorts
American black-and-white films
American short documentary films
1942 documentary films
1940s American films
1940s English-language films
1940s short documentary films